The Formosan lady's slipper or beautiful cypripedium, Cypripedium formosanum, is a species of orchid endemic to Taiwan.

This species is restricted to the central mountains of Taiwan, where it grows in several types of habitat in mountain forests and bogs. It is associated with species of ferns, Epimedium, Trillium, and Podophyllum, and Diphylleia grayi. It is also cultivated, being attractive and easy to grow and propagate.

References

External links 

formosanum
Orchids of Taiwan
Plants described in 1916
Endemic flora of Taiwan
Taxa named by Bunzō Hayata